Theodor Friedrich Wilhelm Poesche (23 March 1825 – 27 December 1899) was a German American anthropologist and author, specializing in historical anthropology.

Life 
Born in 1825 in Zoeschen (now part of Leuna) in the Province of Saxony of the Kingdom of Prussia, Poesche became a
student of philosophy at the University of Halle and later a revolutionary. After the counterrevolution in 1850, he emigrated to the United States.  In 1853, he published The New Rome, or The United States of the World, a book in which he compares the United States to the Roman Empire. 

In 1878, he published The Aryans: A contribution to historical anthropology. Based on the physical characteristics attributed to Indo-Europeans (fair hair, blue or light eyes, tallness, slim hips, fine lips, a prominent chin) by the philologist Ludwig Geiger, Poesche placed the origin of the Aryans in the vast Rokitno Marshes, then in the Russian Empire, now covering much of the southern part of Belarus and the north-west of the Ukraine, where albinism was common. Similarly, he argued that the Lithuanian language is as near to the parent language of Indo-European as Sanskrit. Adding linguistic and archaeological arguments, Karl Penka later expanded the area of origin to include northern Germany and Scandinavia. 

Poesche died in Washington on 27 December 1899.

Works 
The New Rome, or The United States of the World (with Charles Goepp), New York, 1853 
Die Arier, ein Beitrag zur historischen Anthropologie, Jena, 1878

References
Anton Bettelheim, Biographisches Jahrbuch und deutscher Nekrolog (G. Reimer, 1900, p. 206) 
Frank Spencer, History of Physical Anthropology, 1997, p. 110
Bruce Lincoln, Theorizing Myth: Narrative, Ideology, and Scholarship, University of Chicago Press, 1999, p. 253, note 18
Edwin Bryant, The Quest for the Origins of Vedic Culture: The Indo-Aryan Migration Debate, Oxford University Press, 2001, p. 32 

1825 births
1899 deaths
People from Leuna
People from the Province of Saxony
German anthropologists
Martin Luther University of Halle-Wittenberg alumni